The Bahia coastal forests are a tropical moist broadleaf forest ecoregion of eastern Brazil, part of the larger Atlantic Forest region.

Setting
The Itapicuru River forms the northern boundary of the ecoregion, which extends south to near the Itapemirim River. The ecoregion is bounded on the east by the Atlantic Ocean and the enclaves of the Atlantic Coast restingas forests and Bahia mangroves. To the west, the forests transition to the drier Bahia interior forests.

The forests cover Tertiary sedimentary plateaus extending from near the seacoast westward to the lower slopes of the Serra da Mantiqueira. The prevalent soils are tropical nutrient-poor yellow-red latosol and podzols.

Climate
The ecoregion has a tropical climate with annual rainfall ranging from 1,200 to 1,800 mm, evenly distributed throughout the year. The southern portion of the ecoregion may experience a dry period from May through September.

Flora
The four-tiered Atlantic evergreen moist forests are the predominant vegetation type.

Fauna

Endangered mammals in the ecoregion include the maned three-toed sloth (Bradypus torquatus) and golden-headed lion tamarin (Leontopithecus chrysomelas).

Conservation and threats
Less than 5% of the original forest cover remains intact. Protected areas in the ecoregion include Sooretama Biological Reserve and Linhares Forest Reserve.

References

Atlantic Forest
Neotropical tropical and subtropical moist broadleaf forests
Ecoregions of Brazil

.
Forests of Brazil
Geography of Bahia